B-cell lymphoma/leukemia 10 is a protein that in humans is encoded by the BCL10 gene. Like BCL2, BCL3, BCL5, BCL6, BCL7A, and BCL9, it has clinical significance in lymphoma.

Function 

Bcl10 was identified by its translocation in a case of mucosa-associated lymphoid tissue (MALT) lymphoma. The protein encoded by this gene contains a caspase recruitment domain (CARD), and has been shown to activate NF-κB. This protein is reported to interact with other CARD and coiled coil domain containing proteins including CARD9, -10, -11 and -14, which are thought to function as upstream regulators in NF-κB signaling. This protein is found to form a complex with the paracaspase MALT1, a protein encoded by another gene known to be translocated in MALT lymphoma. MALT1 and Bcl10 thought to synergize in the activation of NF-κB, and the deregulation of either of them may contribute to the same pathogenetic process that leads to the malignancy. Bcl10 is evolutionary conserved since cnidaria and has been shown to be functionally conserved all the way back to zebrafish. Notably, just like the upstream CARD-CC family, Bcl10 is absent in insects and nematodes, and the correlated phylogenetic distribution of Bcl10 and CARD-CC proteins indicate a conserved complex.

Interactions 

BCL10 has been shown to interact with:

 CARD10, 
 CARD11, 
 CARD14, 
 CARD9 
 CRADD,
 IKBKG, 
 MALT1,  and
 TRAF2.

References

External links

Further reading 

 
 
 
 
 
 
 
 
 
 
 
 
 
 
 
 
 
 
 

Proteins
Tumor_suppressor_genes